August Vandekerkhove (Kanegem, 15 October 1838 - Mâcon, 24 March 1923) was a Belgian writer, art-painter and inventor. He wrote under the pseudonym S.U.Zanne.  He started a movement he called Cosmosofie (Cosmosophy), which he claimed it to be the anti-thesis of Theosophy.

He was a friend of the French occultists and Martinists Papus and Jean Bricaud.
He met Helena Blavatsky in Paris in 1884 and also in the United States between 1865 and 1880, but they could not get along with each other.

He wrote in magazines such as La Fronde, La Lumière, Borderland, L'Initiation, La Solidarité Mondiale, La Haute Science, Annales Initiatiques, Petit Journal, 1889, and L'Action Féministe.

August Vandekerkhove was one of the first persons to coin the term, "the Age of Aquarius", in a French magazine, "La Fronde" in late February 1890. This is likely one of the first mentions of the "age of Aquarius", which is said to begin when the March equinox point moves out of the constellation Pisces and into the constellation Aquarius.

Each year, on the afternoon of Palm Sunday, at 5 PM, people gather around his grave at the cemetery of Flacé, rue Ambroise Paré, in Mâcon in France to remember him.

References

Belgian feminists
Belgian painters
19th-century Belgian inventors
19th-century Belgian dramatists and playwrights
19th-century Belgian male writers
20th-century Belgian dramatists and playwrights
Belgian male dramatists and playwrights
Belgian occult writers
Belgian educational theorists
Belgian Theosophists
Male feminists
1838 births
1923 deaths